"Welcome to the Jungle" is a song by American hip hop recording artists Kanye West and Jay-Z, from their collaborative album Watch the Throne (2011). Additional vocals are provided by Swizz Beatz and Acapella Soul, and Swizz Beatz also produced the song. It plays an interlude afterwards that samples "Tristessa" by Orchestra Njervudarov. The song was praised by music critics, with Jay-Z usually pointed out as the main star. Rolling Stone listed it as the 20th best song of 2011.

Composition and lyrics
The interlude that plays after the song as part of the same track contains a sample of "Tristessa" by Orchestra Njervudarov, which is also sampled after "No Church in the Wild" and "New Day", as well as before "Illest Motherfucker Alive". Despite it sharing the title of famous Guns N' Roses single "Welcome to the Jungle",  the song does not sample it or have a similar sound, but Jay-Z describes himself as "black Axl Rose" in reference to one of the band's members. At one point, he references the death of Michael Jackson with the line: "Rest in peace to the leader of the Jackson 5". The majority of the rapping throughout the song is contributed by Jay-Z. In the track's introduction, West references a line from "Da Art of Storytellin' (Part 1)" by Outkast.

Recording
The track's producer Swizz Beatz, who also provided additional vocals on the song, described working with West and Jay-Z on the album songs "Welcome to the Jungle", "Who Gon Stop Me" and "Murder to Excellence" as "like being in the studio with Quincy Jones and Michael Jackson at the same time".

Critical reception
"Welcome to the Jungle" was met with acclaim from music critics and Jay-Z's verses were cited as the highlight by many of them. Erika Ramirez of Billboard described the track as being where West and Jay-Z both "shed light to the darkness of their lifestyle". Jay-Z's rapping on it was viewed as the highlight by Tom Breihan of Pitchfork, since he pointed out that "On "Welcome to the Jungle", Jay, never a tortured pop star, actually says, "I'm fuckin' depressed."" as being an example of when "[him] and Kanye address matters beyond their bank accounts" on the album. His presence was viewed as the highlight by Brian Josephs of Complex too, since when comparing Jay-Z's rapping to Swizz Beatz' production, he described Jay-Z as being "who the song mostly belongs to". Popdust wrote that "Jay kills it on his two lengthy [verses]", but pointed out Swizz Beatz' usage of the line "Goddammit" as being the track's "most quotable line", though the line was described as "hardly groundbreaking"  by the site and Jay-Z was pointed out as undeniably being the best performer.

The song was listed at number 20, out of 50, on Rolling Stone'''s best of 2011 list.

Commercial performance
"Welcome to the Jungle" spent a total of three weeks on the US Billboard'' Bubbling Under R&B/Hip-Hop Singles chart and peaked at number 4.

Credits and personnel
Produced by Swizz Beatz
Recorded by Noah Goldstein at Tribeca Grand Hotel, NYC and at (The Mercer) Hotel, New York and Ken Lewis and Brent Kolato at (The Mercer) Hotel, New York
Mixed by Mike Dean at (The Mercer) Hotel, New York
Keys: Mike Dean
Instruments by Ken Lewis
Additional vocals: Swizz Beatz, Acapella Soul

Charts

References

2011 songs
Jay-Z songs
Kanye West songs
Song recordings produced by Swizz Beatz
Songs written by Jay-Z
Songs written by Kanye West
Songs written by Mike Dean (record producer)
Songs written by Swizz Beatz